Gerhard Lohfink (born 29 August 1934) is a German Catholic priest and theologian. He was born in Frankfurt am Main and was professor of New Testament at the University of Tübingen until 1986. Lohfink works as a theologian in the Catholic Integrated Community (KIG). He is the younger brother of Norbert Lohfink, professor of Old Testament.

Life

Lohfink graduated in 1954 from the Heinrich-von-Gagern-Gymnasium. He spent two semesters studying German and Latin at the Johann Wolfgang Goethe University in Frankfurt am Main. From 1955 on he studied philosophy and theology at the Philosophical-Theological College Sankt Georgen. In 1957 he passed the philosophical Final Examination. In 1957 and 1958 he studied theology at the Catholic Theological Faculty of the Ludwig Maximilian University of Munich. He passed the theological Final Examination in 1960 at the University of St. Georgen, in the same year he was ordained a priest by Bishop Wilhelm Kempf. From 1961 to 1963 he was chaplain in the parish of St. Ursula in Oberursel.

Bishop Kempf granted him permission for Lohfink to pursue a doctorate in theology with the requirement that he would initially serve as a pastor for a year in Frankfurt. In 1964 he continued his studies in theology at the Julius-Maximilians-University Würzburg. In 1971 Lohfink earned his doctorate with the dissertation The Ascension of Jesus: Studies on the Ascension and Exaltation texts in Lukas. He habilitated (qualified as a teacher) in 1973 with his work The Collection of Israel: An examination of Lukan Ecclesiology.

In 1973 Lohfink was appointed scientific council and professor of New Testament at the Catholic Theological Faculty of University of Tübingen. In 1976 he was appointed ordinary for New Testament. In 1979 and 1980 he was involved as a deputy of the theological faculty in the ecclesiastical dispute over Hans Küng. At the end Lohfink publicly voted for Küngs’ exclusion from the faculty.

In 1987 he left the university on his own behalf to live in Bad Tölz and work in the Catholic Integrated Community. He continues to research and lecture on ecclesiology and eschatology. His books have been translated into many languages.

Writings (selection)

 Die Himmelfahrt Jesu – Erfindung oder Erfahrung? Verlag Katholisches Bibelwerk, Stuttgart 1972, .
 Die Sammlung Israels. Eine Untersuchung zur lukanischen Ekklesiologie. Kösel, München 1975, .
 Wie hat Jesus Gemeinde gewollt? Zur gesellschaftlichen Dimension des christlichen Glaubens. Herder, Freiburg im Breisgau 1982, 
 Gottes Taten gehen weiter : Geschichtstheologie als Grundvollzug neutestamentlichen Gemeinden. Herder, Freiburg im Breisgau 1984, .
 Die Bibel: Gotteswort in Menschenwort. Verlag Katholisches Bibelwerk, Stuttgart 1986, .
 Wem gilt die Bergpredigt? zur Glaubwürdigkeit des Christlichen. Herder, Freiburg im Breisgau 1993, .
 Braucht Gott die Kirche? – zur Theologie des Volkes Gottes. Herder, Freiburg im Breisgau 1998, 
 Das Vaterunser neu ausgelegt. Urfeld, Bad Tölz 2007, .
 with Ludwig Weimer: Maria – nicht ohne Israel. Eine neue Sicht der Lehre von der unbefleckten Empfängnis. Herder, Freiburg im Breisgau 2008; 2nd edition 2012, .
 Welche Argumente hat der neue Atheismus? Eine kritische Auseinandersetzung. Urfeld, Bad Tölz 2008, .
 Der letzte Tag Jesu. Was bei der Passion wirklich geschah. Verlag Katholisches Bibelwerk, Stuttgart 2009, .
 Beten schenkt Heimat. Theologie und Praxis des christlichen Gebets. Herder, Freiburg im Breisgau 2010, .
 Jesus von Nazareth. Was er wollte, wer er war. Herder, Freiburg im Breisgau 2011, .
 Gegen die Verharmlosung Jesu. Reden über Jesus und die Kirche. Herder, Freiburg im Breisgau 2013 e-book -, .
 Der neue Atheismus. Eine kritische Auseinandersetzung. Verlag Katholisches Bibelwerk, Stuttgart 2014, .
 Auf der Erde – wo sonst? Unangepasstes über Gott und die Welt. Verlag Katholisches Bibelwerk, Stuttgart 2015, .
 Im Ringen um die Vernunft. Reden über Israel, die Kirche und die Europäische Aufklärung. Herder, Freiburg im Breisgau 2016, .
 Am Ende das Nichts? Über Auferstehung und ewiges Leben. Herder, Freiburg im Breisgau 2017, 
 The Gospels. God's Word in Human Words. Chicago 1972, Franciscan Herald Press (Herald Biblical booklets), 
 with Malina, Bruce J. The conversion of St. Paul: Narrative and History in Acts. Chicago 1976, Franciscan Herald Press. 1976 
 Death is Not the Final Word. Chicago 1977: Franciscan Herald Press (Synthesis series). 
 The Bible: Now I Get It! A Form-criticism Handbook, Garden City, N.Y. 1979: Doubleday. 
 Did Jesus Found a Church? In: Theology Digest 1982 (30), page 231–235.
 Jesus and community. The Social Dimension of Christian faith. Philadelphia, New York, 1984 Fortress Press; Paulist Press. 
 The Last Day of Jesus. An Enriching Portrayal of the Passion. Notre Dame, 1984, Ind.: Ave Maria Press. 
 Jesus' Death and the Church's Life. In: Theology Digest 1985 (32), page 156–158.
 The Miracle at Cana. In: Theology Digest 1985 (32), page 243–246.
 The Work of God Goes On. Philadelphia, 1987 Fortress Press, 
 The exegetical predicament concerning Jesus' kingdom of God proclamation. In: Theology Digest 1989 (36), page 103–110.
 Does God Need the Church? Toward a Theology of the People of God. Collegeville, MN, 2014, Liturgical Press. 
 No Irrelevant Jesus. On Jesus and the Church Today. Collegeville, MN, 2014, Liturgical Press. 
 Jesus of Nazareth. What He Wanted, Who He was. Collegeville, Minn., 2015, Liturgical Press. 
 Is This All There Is? On Resurrection and Eternal Life, Collegeville, Minnesota 2018. 
 Did the Early Christians Understand Jesus? Nonviolence, Love of Neighbor, and Imminent Expectation. In: Plough Quarterly Magazine (8).The Plough Magazine: Did the early Christians understand Jesus?
 Das Geheimnis des Galiläers - Ein Nachtgespräch über Jesus von Nazareth. Herder, Freiburg im Breisgau 2019, .
 The Our Father. A New Reading. Collegeville (Liturgical Press) 2019, 
 Prayer Takes Us Home. The Theology and Practice of Christian Prayer. Collegeville (Liturgical Press) 2020,  
 The Forty Parables of Jesus. Collegeville (Liturgical Press) 2021, 
 The Christian Faith Explained in 50 Letters. New York (Paulist Press) 2022,

Reviews

 Thomas D. Stegman (2013): The Living Presence of God. Jesus of Nazareth by Gerhard Lohfink. In: America The Jesuit Review 2013. (18 March 2013)
 James Martin (2013): Jesus, by the Book. America The Jesuit Review.
 Stanley Hauerwas (2014): The Untamed Jesus. In review: No Irrelevant Jesus, by Gerhard Lohfink. The Christian Century.
 Jonathan Martin Ciraulo (2016): Review: “No Irrelevant Jesus” by Gerhard Lohfink. Hg. v. Church Life Journal. University of Notre Dame.
 Wholeness is the Inmost Principle of the Sermon on the Mount. Cruciform Phronesis.

References

External links

 Literature of Gerhard Lohfink in Deutsche Nationalbibliothek
 Catholic Integrated Community
 Chair for the Theology of the people of God - Distance Learning

20th-century German Catholic theologians
1936 births
Living people
20th-century German Roman Catholic priests
German biblical scholars
Roman Catholic biblical scholars
New Testament scholars
Clergy from Frankfurt
Academic staff of the University of Tübingen
Ludwig Maximilian University of Munich alumni
Goethe University Frankfurt alumni